Omnowsheh (also Romanized as Omm ol Nowsheh) is a village in Gharb-e Karun Rural District, in the Central District of Khorramshahr County, Khuzestan Province, Iran. At the 2006 census, its population was 114, in 19 families.

References 

Populated places in Khorramshahr County